Bruce Thompson may refer to:

 Bruce Thompson (California politician) (born 1953), member of the California State Assembly
 Bruce Thompson (Georgia politician), member of the Georgia State Senate
 Bruce Thompson (wrestler) (born 1951), American Olympic wrestler
 Bruce Rutherford Thompson (1911–1992), United States federal judge

See also
 Bruce Thomson (disambiguation)